Malaka is a Spanish thriller television series created by Daniel Corpas Hansen and Samuel Pinazo, produced by Globomedia and Javier Olivares, and starring Maggie Civantos, Salva Reina and Vicente Romero. It is directed by Marc Vigil. It premiered on La 1 on 9 September 2019.

Premise 
Set in Málaga, the fiction starts with the disappearance of Noelia Castañeda (Helena Kaittani). Two police officers—Blanca Gámez (Maggie Civantos) and Darío Arjona (Salva Reina)—are charged with the case.

Cast

Production and release 
Malaka was shot between April and July 2019 in Málaga, Andalusia.

In advance of its television premiere, two episodes of the series received a preview screening at the 2019 FesTVal on 2 September 2019. The series premiered on La 1 on 9 September 2019, with 2 back-to-back episodes.

Awards and nominations 

|-
| align = "center" rowspan = "3" | 2019 || rowspan = "3" | 7th  || colspan = "2" | Best Drama Series ||  || rowspan = "3" | 
|-
| Best Screenplay || Daniel Corpas, Samuel Pinazo, Jordi Calfí, Sergio Sarriá, Santiago Díaz, Luis Miguel Pérez and Isabel Sánchez || 
|-
| Best Drama Actor || Salva Reina || 
|-
|}

References

External links
 
 

2010s Spanish drama television series
2019 Spanish television series debuts
La 1 (Spanish TV channel) network series
Spanish crime television series
Television shows set in Andalusia
Television shows filmed in Spain
2010s crime television series
2019 Spanish television series endings
Television series by Globomedia
Málaga in fiction